The NS/Stick is an 8 string tapping instrument designed by Emmett Chapman and Ned Steinberger.  It incorporates design ideas from both the original Stick and from Ned Steinberger's instruments such as the Stick's tapping fretboard and the Steinberger Bass' knee bar and headless design.  The player can position the instrument upright for tapping or lower it to a horizontal position for picking, slapping, or strumming.

Don Schiff is one of the most well known NS/Stick musicians.

Tunings
 Standard Bass 4ths Can be thought of as a six string bass with two additional higher strings.
 Bb
 F down a 4th
 C down a 4th
 G down a 4th
 D down a 4th
 A down a 4th
 E down a 4th
 B down a 4th
 Guitar Intervals The string arrangement of a 6-string guitar tuned down a fifth (or baritone guitar tuning), with two lower strings.
 A
 E down a 4th
 C down a major 3rd
 G down a 4th
 D down a 4th
 A down a 4th
 E down a 4th
 B down a 4th
 Guitar Lower Octave This tuning puts the E-to-E relationship of a standard guitar, down an octave, in the middle of the 8 strings, with a lower B and a higher A string to round things out.
 A
 E down a 4th
 B down a 4th
 G down a major 3rd
 D down a 4th
 A down a 4th
 E down a 4th
 B down a 4th

External links 
 NS/Stick page at Stick Enterprises website
NSStickist.com - Site dedicated to the NS/Stick, companion site to Stickist.com
Stickist.com - Comprehensive Chapman Stick site with forums, pictures, and more
NS/Stick Forum - NS/Stick forum at Stickist.com

Amplified instruments